Joseph Lee Parker (born April 23, 1952), nicknamed Joel Parker, is an American former college and professional football player who was a wide receiver in the National Football League (NFL) for three seasons in the 1970s.  He played college football for the University of Florida, and thereafter he was drafted by the New Orleans Saints in the fifth round of the 1974 NFL Draft.

Early years

Parker was born in Louisville, Kentucky.  He was a two-sport high school All-American in football and basketball for the Clearwater Tornadoes of Clearwater High School in Clearwater, Florida.

College career

Parker accepted an athletic scholarship to attend the University of Florida in Gainesville, Florida, where he played for coach Doug Dickey's Florida Gators football team from 1971 to 1973.  Memorably, as a junior in 1972, he had seven catches for 112 yards and two touchdowns in the Gators' 40–0 victory over the Kentucky Wildcats.  In an era when the Gators emphasized a running offense, Parker played in 33 games and compiled 43 receptions for 644 yards and five touchdowns.  He graduated from the University of Florida with a bachelor's degree in business administration in 1974.

Professional career

During his 1974 rookie season, he caught 41 passes for a total of 455 yards, which is regarded as one of the top five seasons by a Saints rookie wide receiver in the history of the franchise. He appeared in 22 regular season games, and finished his three-year NFL career with 51 receptions for 585 yards and six touchdowns.

See also

 Florida Gators football, 1970–79
 History of the New Orleans Saints
 Lee McGriff
 List of Florida Gators in the NFL Draft
 List of University of Florida alumni

References

Bibliography

  2013 Florida Football Media Guide, University Athletic Association, Gainesville, Florida (2013).
 Carlson, Norm, University of Florida Football Vault: The History of the Florida Gators, Whitman Publishing, LLC, Atlanta, Georgia (2007).  .
 Golenbock, Peter, Go Gators!  An Oral History of Florida's Pursuit of Gridiron Glory, Legends Publishing, LLC, St. Petersburg, Florida (2002).  .
 Hairston, Jack, Tales from the Gator Swamp: A Collection of the Greatest Gator Stories Ever Told, Sports Publishing, LLC, Champaign, Illinois (2002).  .
 McEwen, Tom, The Gators: A Story of Florida Football, The Strode Publishers, Huntsville, Alabama (1974).  .
 Nash, Noel, ed., The Gainesville Sun Presents The Greatest Moments in Florida Gators Football, Sports Publishing, Inc., Champaign, Illinois (1998).  .
 Proctor, Samuel, & Wright Langley, Gator History: A Pictorial History of the University of Florida, South Star Publishing Company, Gainesville, Florida (1986).  .

1952 births
Living people
Sportspeople from Clearwater, Florida
Players of American football from Louisville, Kentucky
American football wide receivers
Clearwater High School alumni
Florida Gators football players
New Orleans Saints players